The following is a list of the 327 communes of the Landes department of France.

The communes cooperate in the following intercommunalities (as of 2020):
Communauté d'agglomération du Grand Dax
Communauté d'agglomération Mont-de-Marsan Agglomération
Communauté de communes d'Aire-sur-l'Adour (partly)
Communauté de communes Chalosse Tursan
Communauté de communes Cœur Haute Lande
Communauté de communes Coteaux et Vallées des Luys
Communauté de communes Côte Landes Nature
Communauté de communes des Grands Lacs
Communauté de communes des Landes d'Armagnac
Communauté de communes de Maremne-Adour-Côte-Sud
Communauté de communes de Mimizan
Communauté de communes du Pays Grenadois
Communauté de communes du Pays Morcenais
Communauté de communes du Pays d'Orthe et Arrigans
Communauté de communes du Pays Tarusate
Communauté de communes du Pays de Villeneuve en Armagnac Landais
Communauté de communes du Seignanx
Communauté de communes Terres de Chalosse

References

Landes